WHHL (104.1 FM "HOT 104-1") is an urban contemporary radio station serving the Greater St. Louis area. The station is owned by Audacy, Inc. WHHL broadcasts with an ERP of 50 kW and is licensed to Hazelwood, Missouri, a suburb of St. Louis. Its transmitter is located in St. Louis, just outside Forest Park, and operates from offices and studios in Downtown St. Louis.

History

1978-1994: Country 
The station signed on in 1978 as WJBM-FM, airing a full service country format targeting the more Northern areas of the St. Louis metropolitan area, as well as the Metro East area, with its city of license being Jerseyville. The station's transmitter at the time was located north of the city (near Jerseyville), which was a partial hindrance to any chance for success in the market for the next 2 decades, despite later moving to a tower on Douglas Road in Florissant, Missouri. They began targeting St. Louis in September 1985 as country music station WKKX ("Kix 104 FM"), and owned by Shelly Davis' Gateway Radio Partners. Zimmer Broadcasting bought the station out of bankruptcy in July 1991.

1994-1997: Top 40 
On January 20, 1994, WKKX would swap frequencies with Top 40/CHR-formatted WKBQ-FM, with WKKX moving to 106.5 FM, and WKBQ-FM moving to 104.1 FM, and rebranding as "Q104". (WKBQ's simulcast on 1380 AM would continue with the swap.)

WKBQ-FM was also the FM home for St. Louis morning team “Steve & DC” after one of the most significant stories/controversies in St. Louis radio history in the summer of 1993. The popular duo announced on January 6, 1994 that they would return on January 20 to “Q104” at a downtown press conference carried live on television stations KTVI (ch. 2), KMOV (ch. 4), KSDK (ch. 5) and KDNL (ch. 30). Reporters from all major newspapers and magazines presented as well. Emmis Communications bought the station in November 1996, for $42.5 million.

1997-1998: Modern AC 

On January 24, 1997, the Top 40/CHR format was dropped for Modern AC as WALC, "Alice 104.1".

1998-2000: Active Rock 
On June 25, 1998, at 3 p.m., WALC flipped to active rock as "Extreme Radio 104.1" and the WXTM-FM call letters (which were both adopted July 15, 1998). WXTM was the original St. Louis affiliate of The Howard Stern Show.

2000-2004: 80s Hits 
On September 24, 2000, at 2 p.m., after playing "Fade to Black" by Metallica, and after Emmis purchased KPNT (and moved Stern to that station), WXTM flipped to All-80s Hits as WMLL ("104.1 The Mall"). The format would later evolve into a 80s/90s hits format, and would be the home of popular morning DJ's Steve & DC. On November 20, 2003, at Midnight, WMLL began stunting with Christmas music; on December 25, the stunting changed to a "wheel of formats" by playing music from any given genre, as well as old airchecks from past formats on the frequency.

2004-2005: Adult Standards 
At noon on January 8, 2004, the stunting stopped and the station flipped to an Adult Standards format as WRDA, "Red @ 104.1". The first songs on "Red" were "My Kind of Town" and "The Lady is a Tramp", both by Frank Sinatra. The station specialized in "Music with Class" as they called it, playing classic standards singers such as Frank Sinatra, Dean Martin and Bobby Darin, along with more modern 'crooners' such as Rod Stewart and Michael Bublé.

2005-present: Urban Contemporary 
In September 2005, after 18 months of subpar ratings and low advertising revenues, Emmis announced they would sell WRDA to Radio One, for $20 million. The station flipped to its current urban contemporary format as "Hot 104.1" on October 1, 2005 at Midnight. The first song on "Hot" was "Play" by rapper David Banner. The call letters would change to WHHL on November 24, 2005. Radio One would take full possession of the station in 2006 after running it under a local marketing agreement from Emmis. The station's signal problems were finally solved in 2008, when it changed its city of license to Hazelwood and relocated its transmitter to a site in the city of St. Louis, giving the station full market coverage.

On November 5, 2020, Urban One announced that it would swap WHHL, the intellectual property of WFUN-FM, and two other stations in Philadelphia and Washington, D.C. to Entercom, in exchange for its Charlotte, North Carolina stations. Entercom took over the station under a local marketing agreement on November 23. The swap was consummated on April 20, 2021.

References

External links

Audacy, Inc. radio stations
µ
Urban contemporary radio stations in the United States
Radio stations established in 1983